The Indian Shaker Church is a Christian denomination founded in 1881 by Squaxin shaman John Slocum and his wife Mary Slocum in Washington state. The Indian Shaker Church is a unique blend of Indigenous, Catholic, and Protestant beliefs and practices.

The Indian Shakers are unrelated to the Shakers (United Society of Believers) and are not to be confused with the Native American Church.

History and practices

As tradition tells, Slocum (Squ-sacht-um) had died from sickness in 1881 when he revived during his wake reporting a visit to heaven, where he was told by an angel that, "you've been a pretty bad Indian", and where he received instructions to start a new religion. When Slocum became ill again several months later, his wife, Mary, began to shake and tremble uncontrollably in prayer. Soon afterward, Slocum recovered, and his healing was attributed to Mary's convulsions. The religion is thus named for the shaking of members during religious congregations. The shaking is reported to have healing powers.

The story is told that Mary had sent for a casket. John was dead. The casket was brought by canoe, down the river. The casket was just coming around the bend in the river when John revived, and told the people he had met Jesus and what they were to do.

The first church was built at Mud Bay outside Olympia, Washington near the homes of church co-founders and brothers Mud Bay Louie and Mud Bay Sam.

Indian Shakers originally rejected the Bible and all other written scriptures, and instead relied on direct communication between God and the individual. Such Shakers believe that the experience of the Gospel does not require a book, but rather is encoded in the mind and soul in accordance with the will of God. The religion began to be practiced by many unrelated peoples along the Northwest Coast of North America, such as the Klallam, Quinault, Lower Chehalis, Yakama, Hoh, Quileute, Wiyot, Yurok, and Hupa, among others.

 Practices reflecting Catholic influence include the use of hand-held candles, the ringing of individual hand bells (to a very loud volume), and the sign of the cross (usually repeated three times). Protestant influence is shown in public testifying and confession of shortcomings. Native elements include brushing or stroking to remove evil influence, counter-clockwise movement of service participants around the room (often with loud stomping), and spontaneous reception of songs from the spirit. Church members are expected to refrain from using alcohol and tobacco. Carefulness, kindness, and supplication to God for help are emphasized.

The new religion encountered much opposition and hostility from Euro-Americans. As had happened with the Ghost Dance, there was much misunderstanding and Anglos feared an Indian uprising. For a time, all Indian religious practices were banned by law, and the Indian Shakers were included. Many members were imprisoned and chained for their practices. Powell et al. (1976) show two notices posted by the US Indian Service at Quileute Reservation:

During the latter part of the 20th century, the denomination had 20 congregations with about 2,000 members. In the 1960s, a break occurred among Indian Shakers in which one "conservative" faction continued to reject written religious material while another "progressive" faction was more tolerant of the use of the Bible and other written material.

Indian Shakers continue to practice on the Northwest Coast in Washington, Oregon, California, and British Columbia.

See also
List of Indian Shaker Church buildings in Washington

Footnotes

References

Bibliography

Ruby, Robert H.; & Brown, John A. (1996). John Slocum and the Indian Shaker Church. University of Oklahoma Press. .

Further reading
Amoss, Pamela T. (1990). The Indian Shaker Church. In W. Suttles (Ed.), Northwest Coast. Handbook of North American Indians (Vol. 7). Washington, D.C.: Smithsonian Institution Press.
Barnett, H. G. (1957). Indian Shakers: A messianic cult of the Pacific Northwest. Carbondale: Southern Illinois University Press.
Castile, George P. (1982). The 'Half-Catholic' movement: Edwin and Myron Eells and the rise of the Indian Shaker Church. Pacific Northwest Quarterly, 73, 165-174.
Eells, Myron. (1886). Ten years of missionary work among the Indians at Skokomish, Washington Territory, 1874-1884 (pp. 180–237). Boston.
Fredson, Jean T. (1960). Religion of the Shakers. In H. Deegan (Ed.), History of Mason County Washington. Shelton, WA.
Giovannetti, Joseph M. (1994). Indian Shaker Church. In Native America in the twentieth century: An encyclopedia (pp. 266–267). New York: Garland Publishing.
Gunter, Erna. (1977). The Shaker Religion of the Northwest. In J. A. Halseth & B. A. Glasrud (Eds.), The Northwest mosaic: Minority conflicts in Pacific Northwest history. Boulder, CO: Pruett Publishing Company.
Harmon, Alexandra. (1999). Indians in the making: Ethnic relations and Indian identities around Puget Sound (pp. 125–130). Berkeley: University of California Press.
Harmon, Ray. (1971). Indian Shaker Church, The Dalles. Oregon Historical Quarterly, 72, 148-158.
Ober, Sarah E. (1910). A new religion among the West Coast Indians. The Overland Monthly, 56 (July–December).
Sackett, Lee. (1973). The Siletz Indian Shaker Church. Pacific Northwest Quarterly, 64 (July), 120-26.
Valory, Dale. (1966). The focus of Indian Shaker healing. The Kroeber Anthropological Society Papers (No. 35). Berkeley: Kroeber Anthropological Society.
From the University of Washington Libraries Digital Collections - American Indians of the Pacific Northwest Collection:
The Siletz Indian Shaker Church 
The "Half-Catholic" movement: Edwin and Myron Eells and the rise of the Indian Shaker Church 
The Indian Connection: Judge James Wickersham and the Indian Shakers (1990)
The Present Status and Probable Future of the Indians of Puget Sound (1914) (see: pp. 18–20) 
The Swinomish People and Their State (1936) (see: pp. 293–295)

External links

Native American Christianity
Christian denominations established in the 19th century
Christianity and religious syncretism
Christianity in Oregon
Coast Salish culture
Hupa
Indigenous Christianity
Indigenous culture of the Plateau
Religious organizations established in 1881
1881 establishments in Washington Territory